Podonephelium is a genus of shrubs and trees in the family Sapindaceae.  The genus is  endemic to New Caledonia in the Pacific and contains nine species. Its closest relative is Alectryon.

List of species

 Podonephelium concolor
 Podonephelium cristagalli
 Podonephelium davidsonii
 Podonephelium gongrocarpum
 Podonephelium homei
 Podonephelium pachycaule
 Podonephelium parvifolium
 Podonephelium plicatum
 Podonephelium subaequilaterum

References

Sapindaceae
Sapindaceae genera
Endemic flora of New Caledonia
Taxa named by Henri Ernest Baillon